The Isărescu Cabinet was the 114th cabinet of Romania, incumbent between 22 December 1999 and 28 December 2000. It was led by Mugur Isărescu. t was a coalition cabinet formed between the winner of the elections, CDR (Convenția Democrată Română, the Romanian Democratic Convention, which included PNȚCD, PNL, PER), USD (Uniunea Social Democrată, the Social Democratic Union, which included PD and PSDR), and UDMR.

Members

Cabinets of Romania
1999 establishments in Romania
2000 disestablishments in Romania
Cabinets established in 1999
Cabinets disestablished in 2000